Loutre Township is an inactive township in Montgomery County, in the U.S. state of Missouri.

Loutre Township was established in 1818, taking its name from the Loutre River.

References

Townships in Missouri
Townships in Montgomery County, Missouri